The following outline is provided as an overview of and topical guide to Mongolia:

Mongolia – landlocked sovereign country located in East-Central Asia.  It borders Russia to the north and China to the south. Ulaanbaatar, the capital and largest city, is home to about 38% of the population.

At 1,564,116 square kilometres, Mongolia is the nineteenth largest, and the most sparsely populated independent country in the world with a population of around 2.9 million people. It is also the world's second-largest landlocked country after Kazakhstan. The country contains very little arable land, as much of its area is covered by arid and unproductive steppes, with mountains to the north and west and the Gobi Desert to the south. Approximately thirty percent of the country's 2.9 million people are nomadic or semi-nomadic. The predominant religion in Mongolia is Tibetan Buddhism, and the majority of the state's citizens are of the Mongol ethnicity, though Kazakhs, Tuvans, and other minorities also live in the country, especially in the west.

General reference 

 Pronunciation: [mɔŋ'gəuliə]
 Common English country name:  Mongolia, archaic Outer Mongolia
 Official English country name:  Mongolia
 Common endonym(s): Монгол (Mongol)
 Official endonym(s): Монгол Улс (Mongol Uls)
 Demonym(s): Mongolian, Mongol
 International rankings of Mongolia
 ISO country codes:  MN, MNG, 496
 ISO region codes:  See ISO 3166-2:MN
 Internet country code top-level domain:  .mn

Geography of Mongolia 

Geography of Mongolia
 Mongolia is: a landlocked country
 Location:
 Northern Hemisphere and Eastern Hemisphere
 Eurasia
 Asia
 Central Asia
 East Asia
 Time zones:
 Eastern and Central – UTC+08
 Western – UTC+07
 Extreme points of Mongolia
 High:  Khüiten Peak 
 Low:  Hoh Nuur 
 Land boundaries:  8,220 km
 4,677 km
 3,543 km
 Coastline:  none
 Population of Mongolia: 2,629,000  - 138th most populous country

 Area of Mongolia: 1,564,116 km2
 Atlas of Mongolia

Environment of Mongolia 

 Climate of Mongolia
 Protected areas of Mongolia
 Biosphere reserves in Mongolia
 National parks of Mongolia
 Wildlife of Mongolia
 Fauna of Mongolia
 Birds of Mongolia
 Mammals of Mongolia
 Environmental issues in Mongolia

Natural geographic features of Mongolia 

 Lakes of Mongolia
 Mountains of Mongolia
 Volcanoes in Mongolia
 Rivers of Mongolia
 List of World Heritage Sites in Mongolia

Regions of Mongolia

Ecoregions of Mongolia

Administrative divisions of Mongolia 

Administrative divisions of Mongolia
 Aimags of Mongolia
 Sums of Mongolia (districts)

Aimags of Mongolia 

Aimags of Mongolia

Sums of Mongolia 

Sums of Mongolia

Municipalities of Mongolia 

 Capital of Mongolia: Ulaanbaatar
 Cities of Mongolia

Demography of Mongolia 

Demographics of Mongolia

Government and politics of Mongolia 

Politics of Mongolia
 Form of government: unitary semi-presidential representative democratic republic
 Capital of Mongolia: Ulaanbaatar
 Elections in Mongolia
 Political parties in Mongolia

Branches of the government of Mongolia 

Government of Mongolia

Executive branch of the government of Mongolia 
 Head of state: President of Mongolia, Tsakhiagiin Elbegdorj
 Head of government: Prime Minister of Mongolia, Jargaltulgyn Erdenebat

Legislative branch of the government of Mongolia 

 Parliament of Mongolia: State Great Khural (unicameral)

Judicial branch of the government of Mongolia 

Judiciary of Mongolia
 Supreme Court of Mongolia
 Judicial General Council of Mongolia
 Constitutional Court of Mongolia

Foreign relations of Mongolia 

Foreign relations of Mongolia
 Diplomatic missions in Mongolia
 Sino-Mongolian relations

International organization membership 
Mongolia is a member of:

Asian Development Bank (ADB)
Association of Southeast Asian Nations Regional Forum (ARF)
Colombo Plan (CP)
European Bank for Reconstruction and Development (EBRD)
Food and Agriculture Organization (FAO)
Group of 77 (G77)
International Atomic Energy Agency (IAEA)
International Bank for Reconstruction and Development (IBRD)
International Civil Aviation Organization (ICAO)
International Criminal Court (ICCt)
International Criminal Police Organization (Interpol)
International Development Association (IDA)
International Federation of Red Cross and Red Crescent Societies (IFRCS)
International Finance Corporation (IFC)
International Fund for Agricultural Development (IFAD)
International Labour Organization (ILO)
International Maritime Organization (IMO)
International Monetary Fund (IMF)
International Olympic Committee (IOC)
International Organization for Migration (IOM)
International Organization for Standardization (ISO)
International Red Cross and Red Crescent Movement (ICRM)
International Telecommunication Union (ITU)
International Telecommunications Satellite Organization (ITSO)

International Trade Union Confederation (ITUC)
Inter-Parliamentary Union (IPU)
Multilateral Investment Guarantee Agency (MIGA)
Nonaligned Movement (NAM)
Organization for Security and Cooperation in Europe (OSCE) (partner)
Organisation for the Prohibition of Chemical Weapons (OPCW)
Shanghai Cooperation Organisation (SCO) (observer)
United Nations (UN)
United Nations Conference on Trade and Development (UNCTAD)
United Nations Educational, Scientific, and Cultural Organization (UNESCO)
United Nations Industrial Development Organization (UNIDO)
United Nations Mission for the Referendum in Western Sahara (MINURSO)
United Nations Mission in Liberia (UNMIL)
United Nations Mission in the Sudan (UNMIS)
United Nations Observer Mission in Georgia (UNOMIG)
United Nations Organization Mission in the Democratic Republic of the Congo (MONUC)
Universal Postal Union (UPU)
World Customs Organization (WCO)
World Federation of Trade Unions (WFTU)
World Health Organization (WHO)
World Intellectual Property Organization (WIPO)
World Meteorological Organization (WMO)
World Tourism Organization (UNWTO)
World Trade Organization (WTO)

Law and order in Mongolia 

Law of Mongolia
 Capital punishment in Mongolia
 Constitution of Mongolia
 Human rights in Mongolia
 LGBT rights in Mongolia
 Freedom of religion in Mongolia
 Law enforcement in Mongolia

Military of Mongolia 

Military of Mongolia
 Command
 Commander-in-chief: President of Mongolia
 Forces
 Army of Mongolia
 Navy of Mongolia: None
 Air Force of Mongolia

Local government in Mongolia 

Local government in Mongolia

History of Mongolia 

 Genghis Khan and the Mongol Empire

Culture of Mongolia 

Culture of Mongolia
 Architecture of Mongolia
 Cuisine of Mongolia
 Languages of Mongolia
 Media in Mongolia
 Museums in Mongolia
 National symbols of Mongolia
 Coat of arms of Mongolia
 Flag of Mongolia
 National Anthem of Mongolia
 People of Mongolia
 Prostitution in Mongolia
 Public holidays in Mongolia
 Religion in Mongolia
 Buddhism in Mongolia
 Christianity in Mongolia
 Hinduism in Mongolia
 Islam in Mongolia
 List of World Heritage Sites in Mongolia

Art in Mongolia 
 Cinema of Mongolia
 Literature of Mongolia
 Music of Mongolia

Sports in Mongolia 

Sports in Mongolia
 Football in Mongolia
 Mongolian wrestling
Mongolia at the Olympics
 Naadam

Economy and infrastructure of Mongolia 

Economy of Mongolia
 Economic rank, by nominal GDP (2007): 142nd (one hundred and forty second)
 Agriculture in Mongolia
 Banking in Mongolia
 Bank of Mongolia (Central bank)
 Communications in Mongolia
 Internet in Mongolia
 Companies of Mongolia
Currency of Mongolia: Tögrög
ISO 4217: MNT
 Energy in Mongolia
 Mining in Mongolia
 Mongolia Stock Exchange
 Tourism in Mongolia
 Transport in Mongolia
 Airports in Mongolia
 Rail transport in Mongolia

Education in Mongolia 

Education in Mongolia

See also 

Mongolia
Index of Mongolia-related articles
List of international rankings
List of Mongolia-related topics
Member state of the United Nations
Outline of Asia
Outline of geography

References

External links 

 Mongolia Government Overview 
 Official Tourism Website of Mongolia
 
 

Mongolia